Khaira Mushtarka is a village in the Nakodar tehsil of Jalandhar District of the Indian state of Punjab. The village is administered by the Sarpanch, an elected representative.

Demographics 
According to the 2011 Census, the village has a population of 775. The village has a literacy rate of 61.77%, higher than the average literacy rate of Punjab.

Most villagers belong to a Schedule Caste (SC) which makes up 55.87% of the total.

Transport

Rail 

Airport 
The nearest international airport is located in Amritsar.

References 

Villages in Jalandhar district
Villages in Nakodar tehsil